Ingeniero Juárez is a settlement in northern Argentina. It is located in the western of Formosa Province.

Populated places in Formosa Province